Emmanuel "Manny" Fantin Piñol (born December 16, 1953) is a Filipino politician, journalist, writer, agriculture advocate and agribusinessman. He most recently served in President Rodrigo Duterte's cabinet as chairman of the Mindanao Development Authority (2019–2021) and Secretary of Agriculture (2016–2019). 

Born and raised in M'lang, Cotabato, he served as the town's mayor from 1995 to 1998. He then served as governor (1998–2007) and vice governor (2007–2010) of Cotabato. He had also worked for the National Grains Authority and was previously a radio and print journalist.

Early life and education 
Piñol was born on December 16, 1953, in Bialong, M'lang, in the then-undivided province of Cotabato. He is the second eldest of 11 children born into an immigrant Karay·a family from Dingle and Pototan in Iloilo. His siblings include, from oldest to youngest, Patricio Piñol, Magpet Mayor Efren Piñol, Cotabato 2nd District Representative Bernardo Piñol, Jr., M'lang Mayor Joselito Piñol, Noli Piñol Sr., Gerardo Piñol, Ferdinand Piñol, Nilo Piñol, and Cotabato Provincial Board member Socrates Piñol. He grew up in the family's rice farm and completed his primary, intermediate, and secondary education in M'lang where he was class valedictorian.

He worked in media starting in 1976. He was a disc jockey for DXCM, the radio station of the University of Mindanao, and a radio journalist and newswriter for DXMS in Cotabato City.

He is a graduate of the University of Southern Mindanao with a bachelor's degree in Development Communication (2006) and a master's degree in Rural and Economic Development (2008). In June 2018, he graduated again from the University of Southern Mindanao after finishing his doctoral degree in rural development.

Government service 

Piñol first entered government service in 1978 as a public relations officer of the National Grains Authority. In the same year, he became an editor for the Philippine News Agency where he worked for 4 years. His career in media also includes serving as senior copy editor and sports columnist for Tempo. He was also a writer for Interior Secretary Rafael Alunan III and President Fidel Ramos prior to becoming mayor of M'lang.

Political career 
Piñol was first elected into public office in 1995 when he ran for mayor as a substitute to his father, former Cotabato Provincial Board member Bernardo Piñol Sr., in their hometown of M'lang, Cotabato. In 1998, he was elected as Cotabato's provincial governor, a position he held for three consecutive terms. During his term as governor, he supported several agriculture programs such as the Malitubog–Maradugao irrigation and bottom-up planning for the province's rubber, oil palm, banana, and coconut industries.

Barred from seeking another term in 2007, Piñol ran as vice governor of Cotabato and won with his former vice governor Jesus Sacdalan becoming the new governor. He is credited with having reduced the province's poverty incidence from 41.6% in 2000 to 25.6% in 2009. He was also known for his opposition to the Memorandum of Agreement on Ancestral Domain (MOA-AD) between the government under President Gloria Arroyo and the Moro Islamic Liberation Front.
 
During the 2010 gubernatorial elections, Piñol was again a candidate for governor of Cotabato but eventually lost to Emmylou Taliño-Mendoza. In the 2013 elections, he again ran for the same position and lost again to the reelectionist governor.

In June 2017, Piñol took oath as a member of the ruling party PDP–Laban. He was also named as the point person for North Cotabato. He was the third member of President Rodrigo Duterte's Cabinet to join PDP–Laban, along with Justice Secretary Vitaliano Aguirre and Energy Secretary Alfonso Cusi.

He was Secretary of Agriculture from 2016 to 2019.

He became chair of the Mindanao Development Authority (MinDA) after being appointed by President Rodrigo Duterte to replace Abul Khayr Alonto, who died on May 9, 2019, due to lung and heart complications.

On October 5, 2021, Piñol resigned from MinDA and PDP–Laban to file his candidacy for the 2022 Senate election; he rejoined the Nationalist People's Coalition (NPC).

Personal life 
Piñol is married to Emily Asentista and they have 3 children: Maria Krista, Josa Bernadette, and Bernhart Immanuel. He is a native speaker of Karay·a.

Piñol also hosted DZRH's Biyaheng Bukid during Duterte's campaign season, eventually getting the early Saturday morning slot, but still reports in Damdaming Bayan's first part.

References

External links 

 Secretary Piñol's profile on da.gov.ph
 Secretary Piñol on Twitter
 Manny Piñol on Twitter
 Manny Piñol on Facebook

|-

|-

|-

1953 births
Karay-a people
Filipino columnists
Filipino radio journalists
Filipino sports journalists
Filipino farmers
Living people
Secretaries of Agriculture of the Philippines
Governors of Cotabato
Mayors of places in Cotabato
Nationalist People's Coalition politicians
People from Cotabato
Duterte administration cabinet members
Ramos administration personnel